Nico Mattan (born 17 July 1971) is a Belgian former road racing cyclist. His greatest achievement in cycling was winning the Gent–Wevelgem classic in 2005.

In 2005 Mattan won the Gent–Wevelgem in a controversial way, as there were claims that he used Publicity cars to sprint past Juan Antonio Flecha. He also won 2 prologues of Paris–Nice, in 2001 and 2003.

He is known to be very superstitious, for instance his lucky number is 17 (the date of his birthdate), if his race number is 17 or if the ciphers add up to 17, he will look very happy and believes he will win. Once he got number 13 and wore it upside down to avoid bad luck because he heard on a 13th that he wouldn't be able to race anymore because of heart problems and lost the leader's jersey in Paris–Nice on a 13th.

Major results

1996
 1st Stage 1 Tour de Wallonie
2001
 1st  Overall Three Days of De Panne
1st Stage 3b (ITT)
 1st Prologue Paris–Nice
 1st GP Ouest–France
 1st Giro del Piemonte
2003
 1st Prologue Paris–Nice
2004
 1st Noord Nederland Tour
2005
 1st Gent–Wevelgem

References

1971 births
Living people
Belgian male cyclists
Cyclists at the 2000 Summer Olympics
Olympic cyclists of Belgium
Cyclists from West Flanders
People from Izegem